There are two mountains called  Shaviklde (meaning "Black Cliff")  in Georgia:
 at an elevation of 2,850 m, the highest peak of the Trialeti Range.

Mountains of Georgia (country)